The 1912 South Dakota Coyotes football team was an American football team that represented the University of South Dakota as an independent during the 1912 college football season. In its second season under head coach James Henderson, the team compiled a 5–1 record and outscored them by a total of 240 to 13.

Schedule

References

South Dakota
South Dakota Coyotes football seasons
South Dakota Coyotes football